SMS Pillau was a light cruiser of the Imperial German Navy. The ship, originally ordered in 1913 by the Russian navy under the name Maraviev Amurskyy, was launched in April 1914 at the Schichau-Werke shipyard in Danzig (now Gdańsk, Poland). However, due to the outbreak of World War I in August 1914, the incomplete ship was confiscated by Germany and renamed SMS Pillau for the East Prussian port of Pillau (now Baltiysk, Russia). The Pillau was commissioned into the German Navy in December 1914. One sister ship was built, .

Pillau spent the majority of her career in II Scouting Group, and saw service in both the Baltic and North Seas. In August 1915, she participated in the Battle of the Gulf of Riga against the Russian Navy, and on 31 May – 1 June 1916, she saw significant action at the Battle of Jutland. She was hit by a large-caliber shell once in the engagement, but suffered only moderate damage. She assisted the badly damaged battlecruiser  reach port on 2 June after the conclusion of the battle. She also took part in the Second Battle of Heligoland Bight, though was not damaged in the engagement. Pillau was assigned to the planned, final operation of the High Seas Fleet in the closing weeks of the war, but a large scale mutiny forced it to be canceled.

After the end of the war, Pillau was ceded to Italy as a war prize in 1920. Renamed Bari, she was commissioned in the Regia Marina (Royal Navy) in January 1924. She was modified and rebuilt several times over the next two decades. In the early years of World War II, she provided gunfire support to Italian troops in several engagements in the Mediterranean. In 1943, she was slated to become an anti-aircraft defense ship, but while awaiting conversion, she was sunk by USAAF bombers in Livorno in June 1943. The wreck was partially scrapped by the Germans in 1944, and ultimately raised for scrapping in January 1948.

Design

She displaced  at full load. Her propulsion system consisted of two sets of Marine steam turbines driving two  propellers. They were designed to give . These were powered by six coal-fired Yarrow water-tube boilers, and four oil-fired Yarrow boilers. Pillau had a crew of twenty-one officers and 421 enlisted men.

The ship was armed with eight  SK L/45 guns in single pedestal mounts. Two were placed side by side forward on the forecastle, four were located amidships, two on either side, and two were side by side aft. She also carried four  SK L/55 anti-aircraft guns, though these were replaced with a pair of two  SK L/45 anti-aircraft guns. She was also equipped with a pair of  torpedo tubes mounted on the deck. She could also carry 120 mines.

Service history

German service
Pillau was ordered by the Imperial Russian Navy as Maraviev Amurskyy from the Schichau-Werke shipyard in Danzig. She was laid down in 1913, and was launched on 11 April 1914, after which fitting-out work commenced. She was requisitioned by the German Navy on 5 August 1914, and renamed Pillau. She was commissioned into the High Seas Fleet on 14 December 1914.

Following her commissioning, Pillau was assigned to II Scouting Group. Her first major operation was the Battle of the Gulf of Riga in August 1915. A significant detachment from the High Seas Fleet, including eight dreadnoughts and three battlecruisers, went into the Baltic to clear the Gulf of Riga of Russian naval forces. On 13 August, Russian submarines fired three torpedoes at the ship, all of which missed. The minesweepers cleared the Russian minefields by the 20th, allowing the German squadron to enter the Gulf. The Russians had by this time withdrawn to Moon Sound, and the threat of Russian submarines and mines in the Gulf prompted the Germans to retreat. The major units of the High Seas Fleet were back in the North Sea before the end of August.

Battle of Jutland

In May 1916, Admiral Reinhard Scheer, the fleet commander, planned to lure a portion of the British fleet away from its bases and destroy it with the entire High Seas Fleet. Pillau remained in II Scouting Group, attached to I Scouting Group, for the operation. The squadron left the Jade roadstead at 02:00 on 31 May, bound for the waters of the Skagerrak. The main body of the fleet followed an hour and a half later. Shortly before 15:30, the opposing cruiser screens engaged;  was the first German cruiser to encounter the British. As the British ships turned away, the German shells fell short, and at 16:17, Pillau and Frankfurt checked their fire. About fifteen minutes later, the three cruisers engaged a seaplane launched by the seaplane tender . They failed to score any hits, but the aircraft was forced off after which its engine broke down and it was forced to land. The three cruisers then returned to their stations ahead of the German battlecruisers.

Shortly before 17:00, the British 5th Battle Squadron had arrived on the scene, and at 16:50 they spotted Pillau, Elbing, and Frankfurt. Several salvos fell close to the German cruisers, prompting them to lay a cloud of smoke and turn away at high speed. At around 18:30, Pillau and the rest of II Scouting Group encountered the cruiser ; they opened fire and scored several hits on the ship. As both sides' cruisers disengaged, Rear Admiral Horace Hood's three battlecruisers intervened. His flagship  scored a hit on Wiesbaden that exploded in her engine room and disabled the ship. The shell exploded below the ship's chart house; most of the blast went overboard, but the starboard air supply shaft vented part of the explosion into the second boiler room. All six of the ship's coal-fired boilers were temporarily disabled, though she could still make  on her four oil-fired boilers, allowing her to escape under cover of heavy fog.

At around 21:20, II Scouting Group again encountered the British battlecruisers. As they turned away, Pillau briefly came under fire from the battlecruisers, though to no effect.  and  both fired salvos at the ship before turning their attention to the battlecruiser ; Pillaus official record states that the British shooting was very inaccurate. Pillau and Frankfurt spotted the cruiser  and several destroyers shortly before 23:00. They each fired a torpedo at the British cruiser before turning back toward the German line without using their searchlights or guns to avoid drawing the British toward the German battleships. By 04:00 on 1 June, the German fleet had evaded the British fleet and reached Horns Reef. At 09:30, Pillau was detached from the fleet to assist the crippled battlecruiser , which was having trouble navigating back to port. Pillau steamed ahead of Seydlitz to guide her back to Wilhelmshaven, but shortly after 10:00, the battlecruiser ran aground off Sylt. After freeing Seydlitz at 10:30, the voyage back resumed, with a division of minesweepers steaming ahead testing the depth to prevent another grounding. Seydlitz continued to take on water and sink lower in the water; she turned around and steamed in reverse in an attempt to improve the situation. Pillau also attempted to tow the battlecruiser, but was unable because the line repeatedly snapped. A pair of pumping steamers arrived in the evening, and slow progress was made through the night, with Pillau still guiding the voyage. The ships reached the outer Jade lightship at 08:30 and anchored twenty minutes later. In the course of the engagement, Pillau had fired 113 rounds of 15 cm ammunition and four 8.8 cm shells. She also launched one torpedo. Her crew suffered four men killed and twenty-three wounded.

Later service
In July 1917, a series of mutinies occurred on several ships of the fleet, including Pillau. While the ship was in harbor in Wilhelmshaven on the 20th, a group of 137 men left the ship to protest a cancellation of their leave. After a couple of hours in the town, the men returned to the ship and began to complete the tasks they had been ordered to do that morning as a show of good will. Pillaus commander did not take the event seriously, and ordered a limited punishment for the crewmen who had staged the protest. In late October 1917, IV Scouting Group steamed to Pillau, arriving on the 30th. They were tasked with replacing the heavy units of the fleet that had just completed Operation Albion, the conquest of the islands in the Gulf of Riga, along with the battleships of the I Battle Squadron. The risk of mines that had come loose in a recent storm, however, prompted the naval command to cancel the mission, and Pillau and the rest of IV Scouting Group was ordered to return to the North Sea on 31 October.

Upon returning the North Sea, Pillau returned to II Scouting Group. They were attacked by British cruisers, supported by battlecruisers and battleships, in the Second Battle of Heligoland Bight. , II Scouting Group flagship, was damaged in the engagement, but the four cruisers managed to pull away from the British, drawing them toward the German dreadnoughts. They in turn forced the British to break off the attack; neither side had significant success in the operation. Pillau emerged from the battle unscathed. On 23–24 April 1918, the ship participated in an abortive fleet operation to attack British convoys to Norway. I Scouting Group and II Scouting Group, along with the Second Torpedo-Boat Flotilla were to attack a heavily guarded British convoy to Norway, with the rest of the High Seas Fleet steaming in support. The Germans failed to locate the convoy, which had in fact sailed the day before the fleet left port. As a result, Scheer broke off the operation and returned to port.

In October 1918, Pillau and the rest of II Scouting Group were to lead a final attack on the British navy. Admirals Scheer and Franz von Hipper intended to inflict as much damage as possible on the British navy, in order to secure a better bargaining position for Germany, whatever the cost to the fleet. On the morning of 29 October 1918, the order was given to sail from Wilhelmshaven the following day. The unrest ultimately forced Hipper and Scheer to cancel the operation.

Italian service

Pillau briefly served in the newly reorganized Reichsmarine following the end of the war. She was stricken on 5 November 1919 and surrendered to the Allies in the French port of Cherbourg on 20 July 1920. She was ceded to Italy as a war prize under the name "U". She was renamed Bari and commissioned into the Regia Marina on 21 January 1924, initially classed as a scout. The 8.8 cm anti-aircraft guns were replaced with  /40 guns. In August 1925, Bari ran aground off Palermo, Sicily; she was refloated on 20 September. On 19 July 1929, Bari was reclassified as a cruiser.

Bari was modified slightly in the early 1930s, with a temporary extension to the bridge and her forward funnel was shortened to match the others. In 1933–1934, she was refitted for colonial service and converted to oil-firing. The six coal-fired boilers were removed to allow for additional oil bunker space, and the forward funnel was removed and the remaining two were cut down. Since the boilers that ventilated into the forward funnel were removed, the funnel was also removed. After returning to service in September, Bari was sent on a deployment to the Red Sea, based in Italian East Africa. She remained there until May 1938, when she was relieved by the new sloop , allowing her to return to Italy. During her deployment to the Red Sea, she was joined by Taranto in 1935.

World War II

By the outbreak of World War II in September 1939, her armament had been increased by six  guns and six  machine guns. She was activated for combat duty in 1940, when she became the flagship of the Forza Navale Speciale (Special Naval Force) during the Greco-Italian War. She supported the invasion of the island of Cephalonia and later shelled Greek positions in mainland Greece. Following the German intervention in April 1941 and Greece's defeat, Bari was tasked with escorting convoys from Italy to occupied Greek ports. In the meantime, Italy had entered the wider World War in June 1940. In 1942, Italy planned to invade the island of Malta, and Bari and Taranto were to lead the landing force, but the operation was called off. In November that year, she served as the flagship of the amphibious force that landed at Bastia in Corsica. She took part in anti-partisan bombardments off the Montenegrin coast later that year.  That year, she was based in Livorno, where she was placed in reserve in January 1943.

In early 1943, she was slated for conversion to an anti-aircraft ship. She was to be rearmed with six  /50 guns, eight  guns, and eight new model 20 mm /65 or /70 machine guns. The work would have required significant resources, and work had not yet begun by 28 June, when American bombers badly damaged Bari at Livorno and she sank in shallow water two days later. At the Italian armistice in September 1943, she was further damaged to render her useless to the German occupiers. The wreck was partially scrapped by the Germans in 1944. She was officially removed from the navy list on 27 February 1947, and raised on 13 January 1948 for scrapping.

Footnotes

References

Further reading

External links
 Bari Marina Militare website

Pillau-class cruisers
Ships built in Danzig
1914 ships
World War I cruisers of Germany
Cruisers of the Regia Marina
World War II cruisers of Italy
Ships sunk by US aircraft
Ships built by Schichau
Maritime incidents in 1925
Maritime incidents in June 1943